The Marconi Bros. is an independent 2008 American comedy drama film. It was written and directed by cousins Michael Canzoniero and Marco Ricci.

Plot
Two brothers quit their family carpet business to make it big with the king of Long Island Wedding Videography.

Cast and crew
The film stars Dan Fogler, Brendan Sexton III, Jon Polito, Zoe Lister-Jones, Patti D'Arbanville, and Stephen Randazzo. The film was edited by two-time Emmy Award-winner Michael Berenbaum.

Releases and reception
In June 2007, the film was one of only ten films selected for participation in the IFP Rough Cut lab.

The film had its world premiere at the South by Southwest (SXSW) Film Festival (March 7–15, 2008). It was the opening night featured film at the 2008 NY Visionfest Film Festival.

For the North America video release, the title was changed to Wedding Bros.

References

External links
Official website

2008 films
American independent films
2008 comedy-drama films
American comedy-drama films
2008 comedy films
2008 drama films
2008 independent films
2000s American films